The Street Child World Cup is a football tournament organised by charity Street Child United that unites street-connected children from five continents ahead of the FIFA World Cup. The tournament provides a platform to champion the rights of street children – the right to identity, the right to protection from violence and the right to education – and challenge the negative perceptions and treatment of street children around the world. Each event is hosted by the country of the same upcoming FIFA World Cup. Previous hosts include South Africa, Brazil, Russia and Qatar.

History
South Africa 2010

The first Street Child World Cup was held in Durban, South Africa, in March 2010 The event brought together teams of street children and former street children from Brazil, South Africa, Nicaragua, Ukraine, India, the Philippines and Tanzania. The participants were between 14 and 16 years old at the time of the event and all had experience of living full-time on the streets without family. Each squad of 9 players included 3 girls. A representative team of young people from Manchester, UK, also took part in the tournament.  This team was mentored by UK children's TV presenter Andy Akinwolere, and his journey was covered on the BBC Children's TV show, Blue Peter.

The Street Child World Cup was initiated by UK human rights charity the Amos Trust.  It was hosted in Durban by Umthombo Street Children and the Durban University of Technology.

Each team was brought by a street child organisation based in the contributing country:
Action for Brazil's Children;
Casa Alianza Nicaragua;
Depaul Kharkiv (Ukraine);
Youth Football Club Rurka Kalan and the Khalsa Football Academy (India);
Caretakers of the Environment Tanzania, through Tanzania Street Children Sports Academy (TSC Sports Academy);
A network of charities worked together to bring a team from the Philippines;
The UK team was brought by the M13 Youth Project.

Between 12 and 22 March 2010, the participating children competed in a 7-a-side football tournament, created artworks which were subsequently exhibited in the Durban Art Gallery and at the Foundling Museum, London, and took part in a youth participation conference.  The outcomes of the conference were published in November 2010 as 'The Durban Declaration'. This emphasises street children's right to be heard, right to a home, right to protection from violence, and right to access health and education.  Girls participating in the Street Child World Cup produced a Street Girl's Manifesto which was published as part of Plan International's 2010 'Because I am a Girl' report on the state of the world's girls.

The artwork created at the event was facilitated by Momentum Arts, a Cambridge-based arts inclusion charity.  Specialised coaching was provided by Coaching for Hope.

The main overall sponsors of the event were Deloitte, and the event was known as the Deloitte Street Child World Cup.

The football tournament was won by India, who beat Tanzania in the finals.  The Shield was won by the Philippines team.  Ukraine won the Fair Play award.

The Philippine team will be managed by the Fairplay For All Foundation.

Brazil 2014

Rio de Janeiro, Brazil played host to the second Street Child World Cup, 

Ahead of the 2014 FIFA World Cup in Brazil, the Street Child World Cup in association with Save the Children, united 230 street-connected children representing 19 countries to play in their own international football tournament, festival of arts and Congress for their rights.

For the first time, a girls’ tournament ran alongside the boys’. Nine girls’ teams played for street-connected, homeless, and at-risk girls around the world, offering a level playing field to show their potential and raise awareness of the specific challenges street-connected girls face. Brazil were crowned champions after a close-fought match versus the Philippines 1-0.

Boys representing 15 national teams played in Brazil. Tanzania reached the final versus their neighbours in Burundi. Tanzania 3–1 Burundi.

Following the Street Child World Cup, the National Secretariat for Human Rights of Brazil invited our partner organisation, O Pequeno Nazareno, to present their ‘Children are not of the streets’ policy at a national summit for street children in 2015.

Pope Francis
He blessed the Street Child World Cup and declared it a “significant initiative”.

HRH Prince William, Duke of Cambridge
HRH Prince William, Duke of Cambridge sent a message of support and encouragement to the teams.

Gilberto Silva
Brazil World Cup Winner and Arsenal invincible, Gilberto Silva came to the tournament and was inspired by the children to become a Street Child United global ambassador.

Bebeto & Zico
Brazil legends Bebeto and Zico visited and pledged their support.

Russia 2018

The third Street Child World Cup took place in Moscow from 10–18 May 2018, bringing more than 200 young people from 19 countries together to campaign for the rights and protection of street-connected children.

Girls teams: Bolivia, Brazil, Egypt, England, India, Kazakhstan, Mauritius, Mexico, Philippines, Russia, Tanzania, USA

Boys teams: Belarus, Brazil, Burundi, Egypt, Indonesia, Kenya, Nepal, Pakistan, Russia, Tajikistan, Uzbekistan 

The young people who played football at Lokomotiv Moscow – the Russian Premier League Champions – were welcomed at the British Ambassador’s Residence, visited Red Square and enjoyed a boat tour of the river Moskva.

Brazil Girls and Uzbekistan Boys won the football tournaments. 

The global football community supported the event, including FIFA World Cup Winner and Arsenal Invincible Gilberto Silva, Khalida Popal, Ryan Giggs, Gary Lineker and Alan Shearer.

Through taking part in the Street Child World Cup Moscow 2018, seven teams (Bolivia Girls, Burundi Boys, Indonesia Boys, Mauritius Girls, Nepal Boys, Pakistan Boys and Tanzania Girls) have been able to take their young people’s messages directly to their governments.

The Street Child World Cup Moscow 2018  provided legacy funding for projects focusing on access to education, protection from violence and legal identity – not just for the young people who travelled to Moscow, but for the 10,000 street children our partners support across the world.

Festival of the Arts

A Festival of the Arts ran alongside the Street Child World Cup Moscow to allow participants to express themselves, build confidence and communicate beyond language barriers. Arts workshops ran throughout the event and the young people shared aspects of their cultures with each other every evening at the Late Show. The Festival of Arts culminated in exhibitions at the General Assembly and at Action’s Loft during the FIFA World Cup.

Qatar 2022

Oxygen Park, Education City, Doha hosted the fourth Street Child World Cup 2022. 

The ten day event brought street-connected young people from across the world together to take part in a football tournament, a festival of arts and advocate for their rights and protection through a child-focused Congress and General Assembly. The General Assembly was attended by HE Sheikha Hind bint Hamad Al Thani, who signed the Qatar Commitment alongside Street Child United CEO John Wroe. Street Child United launched their "One Million and One" campaign at the event, pledging to help one million and one disadvantaged young people receive legal identification. The event was attended by both HH Sheikha Moza bint Nasser and HE Sheikha Hind bint Hamad Al Thani.

The Street Child World Cup 2022 girls tournament was won by Brazil after defeating Colombia. The boys tournament was won by Egypt following a tense penalty shootout against Pakistan.

Participating nations

Below is a list of some participating nations in recent editions.

Results
Until the 2014 edition, teams were composed of both boys and girls. Starting on the 2014 Street Child World Cup edition, there was a separate tournament for boys and girls. As of the 2022 edition, there are 15 boys teams and 13 girls teams.

Boys

Girls

References

External links
http://www.amostrust.org/
Tanzania Street Children Sports Academy

Youth association football competitions for international teams
Non-FIFA football competitions
Street children